Memorial Church of the Holy Cross is a historic Episcopal church at 841 Bleecker Street in Utica, Oneida County, New York. It was built in 1891 and is a cruciform plan structure with a rectangular nave that intersects two flanking transepts at the apse.  It is in the High Victorian Gothic style.  It is currently occupied by a Ukrainian Orthodox congregation.

It was listed on the National Register of Historic Places in 2000.

References

Episcopal church buildings in New York (state)
Churches on the National Register of Historic Places in New York (state)
Gothic Revival church buildings in New York (state)
Churches completed in 1891
19th-century Episcopal church buildings
Churches in Utica, New York
Churches in Oneida County, New York
National Register of Historic Places in Oneida County, New York
1891 establishments in New York (state)